Rohit Sabharwal (born 8 January 1978) is a former Indian cricketer who represented Hyderabad in domestic cricket. He made his debut for Hyderabad in the 2001–02 season.

See also
 List of Hyderabad cricketers

References

External links
 

1978 births
Living people
Indian cricketers
Hyderabad cricketers
Sportspeople from Kanpur